The Honduras women's national under-20 football team is the national women's u-20 football team of Honduras and is overseen by the National Autonomous Federation of Football of Honduras.  The team is allowed to participate at the different UNCAF and CONCACAF women's tournaments; as well to the FIFA U-20 Women's World Cup, although they haven't been able to qualify as of yet.

Competitive record

CONCACAF Women's U-20 Championship

Head to head
 As of 24 June 2017

See also 
 Football in Honduras

External links
Official website
FIFA profile

Central American national under-20 association football teams
Central American women's national under-20 association football teams
w